The Róisín-class large patrol vessel is a class of offshore patrol vessels (OPV)  ordered by the Irish Naval Service from December 1997. The first vessel is named , which is also the name given to the class. Construction on this first vessel commenced in December 1997, and it was commissioned in December 1999. The second vessel was named  and delivered in 2001.

The class's primary mission is fisheries protection, search and rescue, and maritime protection operations, including vessel boardings.

Design
The class was designed by Vard Marine (formerly STX Canada Marine) and has an all-steel hull based on the Mauritian patrol vessel  launched in 1995, but without the helicopter deck and hangar facilities. The level of automation incorporated into the ships' systems allows the ships in the class to be operated with just 44 crew including 6 officers. The class is designed for winter North Atlantic operations.

Names

References

Patrol vessels of the Irish Naval Service
Patrol ship classes